General elections were held in Cuba on 1 November 1912. Mario García Menocal won the presidential election running under the Conjunción Patriótica banner (an alliance of the National Conservative Party and the National Liberal Party), whilst the alliance also emerged as the largest faction in the House of Representatives, winning 26 of the 50 seats.

Results

President

Senate

House of Representatives

References

Cuba
General
Presidential elections in Cuba
Parliamentary elections in Cuba
Cuba
Election and referendum articles with incomplete results